Seventy One (also known as Garner Run) is a tributary of Elk Creek in Elk County, Pennsylvania, in the United States. The amounts of aluminum and iron in the stream are too small to be detectable. However, there are detectable amounts of manganese, acidity, and alkalinity in the stream. A portion of the stream's watershed is part of a greenway. A coal bed also is found near it.

Course
Seventy One begins at the top of a hill in St Marys. It flows southeast for a short distance before turning south-southwest for several tenths of a mile. It then receives an unnamed tributary from the right and then turns south-southwest for several tenths of a mile, entering a valley. The stream then receives another unnamed tributary and turns south for more than a mile. At the end of its valley, it crosses a railroad line and reaches its confluence with Elk Creek.

Tributaries
Seventy One has no named tributaries. However, it does have two unnamed tributaries.

Hydrology
The concentrations and daily loads of aluminum and iron in the waters of Seventy One at its mouth are too low to be detectable. It requires no reduction to meet the stream's total maximum daily load requirements. It requires a reduction of 67 percent to meet the stream's total maximum daily load requirements. The pH of the stream is between 5.5 and 6.1.

The average discharge of Seventy One at its mouth is 1.26 million gallons per day.

Geography and geology

A coal bed known as the Alton Upper Bed occurs in the vicinity of Seventy One, on the stream's western side.

Watershed
The mouth of the stream is in the United States Geological Survey quadrangle of Ridgway. However, its source is in the quadrangle of St Marys.

A portion of the watershed of Seventy One is in a greenway known as the Elk Creek Natural System Greenway Corridor.

History
Seventy One was entered into the Geographic Names Information System on August 2, 1979. Its identifier in the Geographic Names Information System is 1199966.

See also
List of rivers of Pennsylvania

References

Rivers of Elk County, Pennsylvania
Tributaries of the Allegheny River
Rivers of Pennsylvania